A list of notable politicians of the defunct German National People's Party:

A
 Albert Abicht

B
 Georg Bachmann
 Max von Bahrfeldt
 Wilhelm Bazille
 Johann Becker
 Fritz Oswald Bilse
 Otto Christian Archibald von Bismarck
 Albert Brackmann
 Magnus Freiherr von Braun
 Otto Bremer
 Walter Buch
 Rudolf Buttmann

C
 Leonardo Conti
 Walter Cramer

D
 Clemens von Delbrück
 Georg Dertinger
 Otto Dibelius
 Hermann Dietrich
 Herbert von Dirksen
 Ernst von Dobschütz
 Bruno Doehring
 Theodor Duesterberg

E
 Karl von Eberstein
 Paul Eggers
 Franz Etzel
 Hanns Heinz Ewers

F
 Otto von Feldmann
 Alfred Fletcher

G
 Wilhelm von Gayl
 Paul Giesler
 Carl Friedrich Goerdeler
 Albrecht von Graefe 
 Max von Gruber
 Franz Gürtner

H
 Ulrich von Hassell
 Karl Helfferich
 Hans Helfritz
 Wilhelm Henning
 Paul Hensel
 Oskar Hergt
 Hans Heyck
 Friedrich Hildebrandt
 Otto Hoetzsch
 Alfred Hugenberg

J
 Friedrich Jeckeln

K
 Walter von Keudell
 Dietrich Klagges
 Wilhelm Koch 
 Walter Köhler
 Wilhelm Kube
 Richard Kunze

L
 Hans Heinrich Lammers
 Robert Lehr
 Paul Lejeune-Jung
 Paul von Lettow-Vorbeck
 Karl Lohmann
 Hans Louis Ferdinand von Löwenstein zu Löwenstein
 Ferdinand von Lüninck

M
 Ernst Martin 
 Max Maurenbrecher
 Fritz Maxin
 Werner Meinhof

N
 Erich Neumann

O
 Elard von Oldenburg-Januschau

P
 Hugo Paul
 Theodor von der Pfordten
 Ernst Pöhner
 Arthur von Posadowsky-Wehner
 Oskar von Preußen

Q
 Reinhold Quaatz

R
 Robert Rive
 Hans Joachim von Rohr-Demmin
 Alfred Roth

S
 Georg Sattler
 Käthe Schirmacher
 Otto Schlüter
 
 Franz Seldte
 Friedrich-Wilhelm Semmler
 Eduard Stadtler
 Hermann Stieve
 Hermann Strathmann

T
 Wilhelm Teudt
 Erich Timm
 Alfred von Tirpitz
 Gottfried Treviranus

V
 Erich Vagts
 Julius Vogel

W
 Wilhelm Wallbaum
 Kuno von Westarp
 Reinhold Wulle

Z
 Ernst Ziehm
 Leo von Zumbusch

 
German National People's Party